A treble in association football is achieved when a club team wins three trophies in a single season. A continental treble involves winning the club's national league competition, main national cup competition, and main continental trophy. A domestic treble involves winning three national competitions—normally the league title, the primary cup competition, and one secondary competition, such as a secondary cup or state-level league.

Competitions which consist of a single match or a two-leg match are not normally counted as part of a treble (e.g., the FA Community Shield, Supercopa de España, Trophée des Champions, DFL-Supercup, UEFA Super Cup, Recopa Sudamericana, FIFA Club World Cup, Intercontinental Cup, and others).

Continental trebles
This list includes clubs who have won their country's top-tier league and the primary cup competition (the double), in addition to the major continental tournament, all within a single season. Tokyo Verdy of Japan and Barcelona of Spain are the only clubs to win continental trebles for both their men's and women's sections, completing the feat in 2019 and 2021, respectively.

Men
21 men's clubs have achieved the feat, with the first being Celtic of Scotland and TP Mazembe (then known as FC Englebert) of the DR Congo, both in 1967 (Celtic was technically first, completing the treble in May 1967 while TP Mazembe completed it in November). Five men's clubs have won the continental treble two or more times: Al Ahly SC of Egypt, Auckland City FC of New Zealand, FC Barcelona of Spain, FC Bayern Munich of Germany, and Cruz Azul of Mexico. Cruz Azul were the first team to win two of these trebles, winning their second in 1997. Al Ahly and Auckland City are the only teams with more than two continental trebles, with Al Ahly having three and Auckland City having a world-record four. Auckland City completed this achievement first, winning their third treble in 2015 and fourth in 2022. Al Ahly and Auckland City are also the only men's clubs to win trebles in back-to-back seasons, though Al Ahly were the first to do this after winning in both 2006 and 2007. European teams have won the most continental trebles with nine, coming from seven clubs. The only countries to have more than one team win a continental treble are Mexico, New Zealand, and the Netherlands, with two teams winning trebles each.

No South American team has achieved the feat with the above stipulations, making it the only continent to never have a continental treble winner. This can in part be blamed on an absence of a domestic knockout cup in some of South America's nations until recently: the Copa do Brasil only began in 1989, the Copa Argentina restarted in 2011 after a 41-year hiatus, and many countries including Bolivia, Chile, Paraguay, Peru, and Uruguay still do not have one. However, multiple Brazilian teams have won some combination of the Campeonato Brasileiro Série A, their state championship, the Copa do Brasil, and the now-defunct Taça Brasil, plus the Copa Libertadores, but never by winning the Série A, Copa do Brasil, and Copa Libertadores.

Women
Six women's clubs have won a continental treble with these stipulations, five of which are European clubs and one of which is an Asian club. The first to do so was 1. FFC Frankfurt in 2002, who won the treble again in 2008. The only other women's club to achieve it more than once is Olympique Lyonnais Féminin, who has done so five times (a record for both men's and women's clubs). Lyon are also the only women's club to win trebles in back to back years, and have completed this feat on two occasions.

The lack of women's continental trebles compared to men's can largely be attributed to the absence of continental competitions for women until recently. The UEFA Women's Champions League did not begin until 2001, the Copa Libertadores Femenina did not begin until 2009, the AFC Women's Club Championship did not begin until 2019, the CAF Women's Champions League did not begin until 2021, and CONCACAF and the OFC still do not sponsor a continental women's competition (though the CONCACAF Women's Champions League is set to begin in 2024). Additionally, many nations do not have a top level cup competition for women, and some do not even have a national women's football league.

Domestic trebles
Domestic trebles are only possible in some countries, as most only give clubs the chance to win one league title and one cup. However, some countries, especially those which were once British or French possessions, also have a secondary cup competition, usually only accessible to teams in the top few levels of their national league system. A secondary cup competition is the most common way for a team to earn a domestic treble, but there are other formats. For example, Brazil has state-level leagues alongside the Campeonato Brasileiro Série A and the Copa do Brasil; in the United States (plus the Canadian teams that play in the MLS), the domestic treble requires winning the "MLS double" (winning the Supporters' Shield and MLS Cup) plus the U.S. Open Cup or Canadian Championship.

Men
89 men's clubs have won a domestic treble, 26 of whom have done it more than once. The first team to win a domestic treble was Northern Ireland's Linfield in 1921–22. Scottish sides Celtic and Rangers have won the most domestic trebles, each with seven. Celtic and Bayern Munich are the only men's sides to win both a domestic treble and a continental treble, but Celtic are the only one to win both in the same season. Celtic also hold the record for the most consecutive men's domestic trebles with four.

Women
Five women's clubs have won domestic trebles, and three of those teams have won their domestic treble more than once. Scotland's Glasgow City has won the most domestic trebles, with five. Glasgow City also have the most consecutive women's domestic trebles, with four. Arsenal of England became the first women's club to win a domestic treble when they won it in 1992–93. Them, along with Tokyo Verdy Beleza of Japan are the only women's clubs to win both a continental treble and a domestic treble, and each team won the domestic treble in the same season they won the continental treble (2007 for Arsenal and 2019 for Tokyo Verdy).

Notes

See also

 Double (association football)
 Sextuple (football)
 List of association football teams to have won four or more trophies in one season
 Triple Crown of Brazilian Football
 Three-peat

References

External links
 List of domestic trebles from RSSSF

Association football terminology
Association football records and statistics

pt:Tríplice coroa#Futebol